Robert Blakeney may refer to:
 Robert Blakeney (died 1762) (1724–1762), Irish politician
 Robert Blakeney (died 1733) (1679–1733), Irish politician
 R.B.D. Blakeney (1872–1952), British general and fascist politician